Hypselodoris juliae is a species of colourful sea slug or dorid nudibranch, a marine gastropod mollusk in the family Chromodorididae.

Distribution
This nudibranch is known only from the seas around Brazil, but may have a larger range.

Description
Hypselodoris juliae has a golden-brown body and a very intricately folded orange mantle. There are many very thin orange and sometimes blue lines running longitudinally all over the body and dorsum of this nudibranch. The gills and rhinophores are orange to peach in colour, outlined faintly with black.

This species can reach a total length of at least 60 mm and feeds on sponges.

References

 Dacosta, S., Padula, V. & Schroedl, M. 2010 A New Species of Hypselodoris and a Redescription of Hypselodoris picta lajensis (Nudibranchia: Chromodorididae) from Brazil. The Veliger, 51: 15-25

Chromodorididae
Gastropods described in 2010